Ficus fergusonii, is a species of plant in the fig genus, endemic to Sri Lanka.

References

fergusonii
Endemic flora of Sri Lanka